John Henry Harlan (December 21, 1925 – February 27, 2017) was an American television announcer who worked on numerous television projects for over 40 years, particularly game and variety shows. He was from Sonoma County, California.

Perhaps his best-known work was for the Bob Hope specials aired on NBC during the 1960s through the 1990s. Among game show fans, his most memorable outings were You Don't Say! and versions of Name That Tune produced between 1974 and 1985.

Harlan attended California State University, Fresno, graduating in 1948. He served as class president for the fall term. At school he was friends with Wendell Bell, serving as his best man at his 1947 wedding. He married Beverly Christensen, who was a model on Queen for a Day where Harlan was an announcer.

Harlan died on February 27, 2017, at the age of 91.

Shows announced
Golden Globe Awards
People's Choice Awards
Comic Relief (first special only; HBO, 1986)
The Muppets: A Celebration of 30 Years (CBS special, 1986)
Password (ABC, 1971–75)
Tattletales (CBS, 1974)
The Flip Wilson Show
The Merv Griffin Show (when based in Los Angeles)
You Don't Say! (all versions)
Face the Music (1980–81)
Queen for a Day
The Cross-Wits
Catchphrase
Jeopardy! (NBC, 1978–79)
The Krypton Factor
American Gladiators (Syndicated, 1990–93)
Press Your Luck (as a fill-in for Rod Roddy)
Password Plus (as a fill-in for Gene Wood)
Name That Tune; he also served as one of the show's associate producers
Your New Day with Vidal Sassoon
Lucky Numbers (pilot similar to High Rollers in 1985)
50 Grand Slam
Wipeout
All Star Blitz
Celebrity Sweepstakes
It Takes Two
Relatively Speaking
Sports Challenge (final season)
Book of Lists
General Hospital
Jackpot! (Syndicated, 1989–90)
UHF (Film, 1989; voice of in-film promos for U-62)
Make Me Laugh (1979)

Harlan worked on occasional TV specials up until his death in 2017. He was also president of Pacific Pioneer Broadcasters.

Sources

External links 

1925 births
2017 deaths
California State University, Fresno alumni
Game show announcers
Radio and television announcers
People from Sonoma County, California